Eye is a monthly peer-reviewed medical journal covering ophthalmology. It was established in 1881 as the Transactions of the Ophthalmological Societies of the United Kingdom, obtaining its current name in 1987. It is published by Springer Nature and is the official journal of the Royal College of Ophthalmologists. The editor-in-chief is Sobha Sivaprasad (Moorfields Eye Hospital). According to the Journal Citation Reports, Eye has a 2021 impact factor of 4.456.

References

External links

Ophthalmology journals
Nature Research academic journals
Bimonthly journals
Publications established in 1881
English-language journals
1881 establishments in the United Kingdom
Academic journals associated with learned and professional societies of the United Kingdom